La Tour-Blanche is a former commune in the Dordogne department in Nouvelle-Aquitaine in southwestern France. On 1 January 2017, it was merged into the new commune La Tour-Blanche-Cercles.

Population

See also
Communes of the Dordogne department

References

Former communes of Dordogne
Angoumois